Märta Valborg Ekström (28 January 1899 – 23 January 1952) was a Swedish stage and film actress.

Selected filmography

 Charles XII (1925)
 Ingmar's Inheritance (1925)
The Doctor's Secret (1930)
 The Two of Us (1930)
 Unga hjärtan (1934)
 John Ericsson, Victor of Hampton Roads (1937)
 Katrina (1943)
 The Emperor of Portugallia (1944)

References

Further reading

External links

1899 births
1952 deaths
20th-century Swedish actresses